In planetary science, the term unusual minor planet, or unusual object, is used for a minor planet that possesses an unusual physical or orbital characteristic. For the Minor Planet Center (MPC), which operates under the auspices of the International Astronomical Union, any non-classical main-belt asteroid, which account for the vast majority of all minor planets, is an unusual minor planet. These include the near-Earth objects and Trojans as well as the distant minor planets such as centaurs and trans-Neptunian objects. In a narrower sense, the term is used for a group of bodies – including main-belt asteroids, Mars-crossers, centaurs and otherwise non-classifiable minor planets – that show a high orbital eccentricity, typically above 0.5 and/or a perihelion of less than 6 AU. Similarly, an unusual asteroid (UA) is an inner Solar System object with a high eccentricity and/or inclination but with a perihelion larger than 1.3 AU, which does exclude the near-Earth objects.

Other unusual objects 

According to the MPC, other unusual minor planets are objects, which orbital characteristics do not fit those of the near-Earth and distant populations. These objects typically have high eccentricities, and inclinations often more than 90 degrees (retrograde orbits), a criterion that is common among the members of the damocloid population. Object in this list have a TJupiter of less than 3 and a perihelion between 1.67 and 5.5 AU, that is, they do not cross the orbit of Mars but cross or at least come close to Jupiter's orbit at 5.2 AU. According to the SSBN07 classification, such objects have cometary dynamics. , the list contains 211 objects, most of which remain unnumbered. A bold designation links to an object's stand-alone article.

Characteristics 
 Extinct comet, are considered unusual minor planets in having the orbital characteristics of a long period, Jupiter-family or Halley-type comet but showing no sign of cometary activity.
 Damocloid, with typically highly inclined orbits, often being retrograde.

Examples 
 1996 PW (TNO, LPC)
 1998 WU24 (CEN, HTC)
 (33342) 1998 WT24 (NEO)
 2011 YU75 (CEN)

See also 
 Distant minor planet

References

External links 
 MPC data page
 New Object Moves Like A Comet But Looks Like An Asteroid, 1996 PW, JPL, August 1996
 The lightcurve and colors of unusual minor planet 1996 PW
 Unusual Minor Planet 2011 YU75 (remanzacco)
 Unusual Minor Planet 2012 NJ (remanzacco)